Brainstorms first heavy metal DVD with 5 hours of material across two discs. The set contains three live shows, a history of the band, promotional videos and some more "live clip-mix" from various locations.

Disc 1

Live In Budapest, 2005 

 "Worlds Are Coming Through"
 "Blind Suffering"
 "The Leading"
 "Voices"
 "Highs Without Lows"
 Medley -> "Lifeline / Shadowland / Tear Down The Walls"
 "Inside A Monster"
 "Shiva's Tears"
 "Fornever"
 "Soul Temptation"
 "All Those Words"
 "Hollow Hideaway"
 "Burns My Soul"
 "Doorway To Survive"
 "Under Lights"

Live At Wacken Open Air, 2004 

"Shiva's Tears"
"Blind Suffering"
"Doorway To Survive"
"Hollow Hideaway"
"Fornever"
"The Leading"
"Highs Without Lows"
"Under Lights"

Disc 2

Live At Prog Power Festival, 2004 

"Shiva's Tears"
"Blind Suffering"
"Crush Depth"
"Doorway To Survive"
"Voices"
"Hollow Hideaway"
"Fornever"
"The Leading"
"Highs Without Lows"
"Under Lights"

Live At Sziget Festival, 2006 
"Worlds Are Coming Through"
"Painside"
"Inside A Monster"
"All Those Words"

Live In Greece, 2000 
"Crush Depth" (Athens)
"Holy War" (Thessaloniki)

Live At Bang Your Head-Festival, 2003 
"Shiva's Tears"

Live At Rock Hard Open Air, 2006 
"Worlds Are Coming Through"
"Invisible Enemy"
"Shadowland"
"Painside"
"Doorway To Survive"
"All Those Words"

HISTORmY 
Members of the band are talking band history.

Videos 
 "Highs Without Lows"
 "Doorway To Survive"
 "All Those Words"

Band 
 Andy B. Franck – vocals
 Torsten Ihlenfeld – guitars, backing vocals
 Milan Loncaric – guitars, backing vocals
 Andreas Mailänder – bass
 Dieter Bernert – drums

Source of information:Official Brainstorm Homepage

Live video albums
2007 video albums
Brainstorm (German band) albums
2007 live albums
Metal Blade Records video albums